Henri Veesaar (born 28 March 2004) is an Estonian college basketball player for the Arizona Wildcats of the Pac-12 Conference.

College career

2022–present: Arizona Wildcats
On May 20, it was announced that Veesaar would leave Real Madrid youth team and will join Arizona to play college basketball.

National team career
Veesaar made his debut for the Estonian national team when he was 17 years old against Iceland on 27 July 2021. He has also represented the Estonia national U-18 team.

References

External links
 Arizona Wildcats bio

2004 births
Living people
Estonian men's basketball players
Estonian expatriate basketball people in the United States
Basketball players from Tallinn
Arizona Wildcats men's basketball players